Rashing is a small village in Belgaum district of Karnataka state, India.

It is located at Karnataka and Maharashtra border.

References

Villages in Belagavi district